Architecture of Central Asia refers to the architectural styles of the numerous societies that have occupied Central Asia throughout history. These styles include Timurid architecture of the 14th and 15th centuries, Islamic-influenced Persian architecture and 20th century Soviet Modernism. Central Asia is an area that encompasses land from the Xinjiang Province of China in the East to the Caspian Sea in the West. The region is made up of the countries of Kazakhstan, Uzbekistan, Tajikistan, Kyrgyzstan, and Turkmenistan. The influence of Timurid Architecture can be recognised in numerous sites in Kazakhstan and Uzbekistan, whilst the influence of Persian Architecture is seen frequently in Uzbekistan and in some examples in Turkmenistan. Examples of Soviet Architecture can be found in Uzbekistan, Kazakhstan, Tajikistan and Kyrgyzstan.

Timurid architecture 
The Timurid Empire was founded by Timur in 1370 and contained areas of present-day Uzbekistan and Kazakhstan. Timurid architecture employed some Seljuk traditions, and featured grand scale buildings constructed from fired bricks. The exteriors of buildings were decorated with highly detailed blue and turquoise linear and geometric patterning of glazed tiles, inspired by Iranian Banna’i technique. As is consistent with Islamic Architecture, Timurid Architecture also often features domes and minarets, the latter from which the call to prayer is called. 
In the South of modern-day Kazakhstan, the influence of the Timurid Empire can also be found in Turkistan. An example of this architecture is the Mausoleum of Khoja Ahmed Yasawi, which was commissioned in 1389 by Timur in order to replace a smaller 12th century Mausoleum for Khoja Ahmed Yasawi. The partly unfinished mausoleum is an example of the Islamic stylings of Timurid Architecture. It features fired brick construction and geometric patterned decorations made with glazed tiles. The mausoleum also features tiled patterns on the interior of the building.

In Uzbekistan, numerous examples of Timurid Architecture can be found in Samarkand, which was the capital of the Timurid Empire from its establishment in 1370 until it moved to Herat in the early 15th century. As it was the royal city, Timur often brought artisans back from defeated cities to build in Samarkand. An example of Timurid Architecture in Samarkand is the Bibi-Khanym Mosque. The mosque was built between 1399 and 1404 in order to commemorate the wife of Timur, and was completed before Timur’s death in 1405. At the time of construction, it was one of the largest mosques in the world and is still the largest in Samarkand. As is consistent with other Timurid Architecture, the mosque features glazed ceramic designs, a turquoise dome and geometric patterning of walls. Another notable example of Timurid Architecture found in Samarkand is the Gur-e-Amir (or Gur-Emir) Mausoleum. Built in 1403 and 1404, the mausoleum is the tomb of Timur and his sons Shah Rukh and Miran Shah, along with other family members. The mausoleum is decorated with blue and white tiles, as well as large mosaics. These are features of Timurid Architecture and also exhibit Iranian influence. The building also features a large Islamic-style dome and minarets that were refurbished in the 1950s. Timur was born in Shahrisabz, an Uzbekistani city located roughly 50 miles South of Samarkand. In the city, Timur also constructed Aq Saray (White Palace) in 1380 after a victorious battle with Urgench. Despite only part of the original building remaining, Aq Saray also demonstrates being decorated by geometrically patterned glazed tiles, a feature found throughout Timurid Architecture.

Persian Architecture 
Also known as Iranian Architecture, Persian Architecture has an emphasis on decorations and often featured intricate geometric patterns. Persian buildings also feature domes set upon square chambers and are mostly made of fired bricks. Due to the rapid conversion of Iran to Islam after the Arab invasion, many mosques were built that included minarets from which the call to prayer was called, a detail that features in Persian architecture. Whilst the Persian empire did not occupy the land that makes up the countries of present-day Central Asia, its influence can be seen in some of its buildings.
The influence of Persian Architecture can be seen in a number of structures in Khiva, Uzbekistan. Itchan Kala is the name of the internal fortification of Khiva that was the final place for rest used by caravans before their crossing of the desert to Persia. The fortress features large façades decorated in intricate geometric tile patterns, large round domes on square buildings and minarets, all features of Persian Architecture. Other buildings in Khiva that share some of these features are Alla Kouli Khan Madrasa, the Pakhlavan Makhmoud Mausoleum and the Islam Hoja Minaret.

Another Uzbekistani city that features a number of examples of Persian Architecture is Bukhara, in the Southwest of the country. The Kalan Mosque is part of the Po-i-Kalyan religious complex in Bukhara. It features a domed roof set upon square chambers, and decorated with carved mosaics, inspired by Persian architecture. Also in Bukhara is the Chor Minor (Char Minar), a structure that was developed for educating Islamic scholars, completed in 1807. The main façade features a high portal and four minarets, features that appear in Persian architecture. However, the minarets were not used for the call to prayer but instead simply built as an architectural feature.

In Merv in Southern Turkmenistan is the Mosque of Yusuf Hamadani, intended as a memorial construction at the burial place of the Sufi saint. The structure features the dome-shaped portals and the large square building style found in Persian Architecture.

Soviet Architecture 
Under the Union of Soviet Socialist Republics (USSR), the present-day countries of Kazakhstan, Uzbekistan, Tajikistan, Kyrgyzstan, and Turkmenistan were incorporated into the Soviet Union in 1924. These peoples were classified as the nations of Kazakh Soviet Socialist Republic (SSR), Uzbek SSR, Tajik SSR, Kirghiz SSR and Turkmen SSR by the Soviets. These countries remained members of the USSR until declaring independence in 1991, the year of the dissolution of the Union of Soviet Socialist Republics. During their membership of the USSR, the architecture of Kazakhstan, Uzbekistan, Tajikistan and Kyrgyzstan were influenced by Soviet Modernism. Soviet Modernism shares many of the features of Modernist architecture worldwide, including asymmetrical compositions using geometric shapes, flat roofs, modern materials and minimal ornamentation. Whilst maintaining a distinct Soviet appearance, many buildings also incorporated local stylings.

Numerous examples of Soviet Architecture can be found in Tashkent, the capital city of Uzbekistan. The Tashkent Circus building was built in 1976, and demonstrates the incorporation of local design influence by Soviet architects, along with the use of modern materials seen in Soviet Modernism. Another example found in Tashkent is the 17 storey Hotel Uzbekistan. Built in 1974, the still-functioning hotel features geometric shapes with local influences visible, minimal ornamentation and a flat roof, all features commonly found in Soviet Architecture. 
 
In Kazakhstan, numerous examples of Soviet Architecture can be found in Almaty, the former Soviet capital of the country. At the Al-Farabi Kazakh National University, the Main Administrative building was built in the 1970s. The building features geometric shapes, a flat roof and modern materials consistent with Soviet Architecture, whilst also incorporating local ornamentation. Another example found in Almaty is the State Academic Russian Theatre for Children and Youth, founded in October 1944. The building features Soviet Brutalist-style architecture with a flat roof, hard angles and minimal ornamentation. Also in Almaty is the Hotel Kazakhstan, a Soviet style building completed in 1977 featuring modern materials and minimal ornamentation on the building’s walls, and crown ornamentation on the building’s roof. 
In Tajikistan, the influence of Soviet Architecture can be seen in the Dushanbe International Airport, the airport servicing the capital city of Dushanbe. The pictured terminal was opened in 1964, and features the use of modern glass materials and a flat roof. Another example in Dushanbe is the Concert Palace of Dushanbe, designed by Sergo Sutyagin. Completed in 1984, this structure features a flat roof, minimal ornamentation and a design consistent with Soviet Architecture. 
 
In the capital of Kyrgyzstan, Bishkek, a number of examples of Soviet Architecture can be seen. Founded as the State Republic Library in 1934, and later known by other names including V. I. Lenin State Library of the Kyrgyz SSR, this building is now known as the National Library of the Republic of Kyrgyzstan. The building features a flat roof and a symmetrical design utilising modern materials. Also in Bishkek is the National Museum of Kyrgyzstan, formerly known as the Lenin Museum. The building features a flat roof, symmetrical design and minimal ornamentation. Another example is The Bishkek White House that was constructed in 1985 as the Communist Party’s Central Committee’s Headquarters and contains the president’s office. The building features a flat roof and minimal ornamentation consistent with Soviet Modernism.

Modern Architecture 
In Uzbekistan, ruler and creator of Timurid Architecture, Amir Timur has become the embodiment of Uzbek national identify after the collapse of the Soviet Union. To celebrate the 660th birthday of Timur, the remaining Timurid monuments were restored in 1996. These projects are promoted by the Uzbekistani Government and are being undertaken rapidly to commemorate the post-independence prosperity of the nation. As Samarkand and Shahrisabz are known globally as being important examples of architecture in Islamic stylings, the Government wishes to highlight their architecture as part of national identity.

In Kazakhstan, there is also a movement towards developing a distinct architectural image in order to display the country’s national independence. Since being announced by the president in 1994, the city of Astana was created to be the new capital city, transferring this away from Almaty. The old capital city and former Soviet capital of Almaty is home to numerous mentioned Soviet buildings such as the Al-Farabi Kazakh National University, the State Academic Russian Theatre for Children and Youth, and the Hotel Kazakhstan. In Astana, numerous modern buildings have been built. Buildings include the 62-metre-tall Palace of Peace and Reconciliation and the Khan Shatyr Entertainment Centre, the tallest tent in the world. Other modern buildings include the Baiterek Tower and the Hazrat Sultan Mosque, the largest mosque in Central Asia.

In Dushanbe, the capital city of Tajikistan, there is a state-sponsored effort to develop architecture and memorials in order to construct national identity. The city was known as Stalinabad from 1931 to 1961 after Joseph Stalin. The city’s Soviet-era building are being systematically knocked down and replaced by modern buildings. Dushanbe’s central post office has been razed to make way for a new skyscraper. Built in 2002, the Palace of Nations was constructed and is the official residence of Tajikistan’s President. In front of the Palace of Nations is the Dushanbe flagpole that at 165m, was the tallest in the world before this title was taken by the Jeddah Flagpole in Saudi Arabia. Officially opened in 2012, the National Library of Tajikistan is the largest library in Central Asia and has been constructed to look like an open book. The library is also near to the National Museum of Tajikistan, opened in 2011 by the President of Tajikistan and features 22 exhibition spaces with an area of more than 15,000 square metres. These buildings make up the “capitol complex”, which was moved from Rudaki Avenue (formerly known as Lenin Prospekt) intentionally, to a green area adjacent to the Dushanbinka River.In Kyrgyzstan, many of the Soviet-era buildings remain, despite the rebranding of ideologically significant buildings in order to symbolically reshape official city spaces. Previously known as the V. I. Lenin State Library of the Kyrgyz SSR, the library in Bishkek is now known as the National Library of the Republic of Kyrgyzstan. As aforementioned, the National Museum of Kyrgyzstan was formerly known as the Lenin Museum. Due to the country’s large gas reserves, Turkmenistan's capital of Ashgabat now holds the world record for the highest density of white marble-clad buildings in the world with 48,589,619 square feet of marble. Buildings include the city’s international airport terminal Ashgabat International Airport, opened in 2016 at a cost of $2.3 billion. At the city’s Wedding Palace, the building features a Turkmen star encapsulating an Earth displaying the country of Turkmenistan. Another marble structure in Ashgabat is the Monument of Neutrality, completed in 1998 to commemorate the president at the time, Saparmurat Niyazov. The structure is representative of Turkmenistan’s international neutrality.

References 

Central Asia
Central Asia